Allan Smith is an Australian former rugby league footballer who played in the 1970s and 1980s. Allan Smith played for the Queensland Maroons.

Biography
Originally from the Toowoomba Region, he represented the Queensland team in 1977 and 1979.  It was the 1979 game where he scored a record 4 tries in Queensland's loss to New South Wales. He then moved to the New South Wales Rugby League premiership to play for the North Sydney Bears, making him no longer eligible for selection for Queensland in the first two matches of the 1980 interstate series. However, with the last match of that series being the experimental first ever State of Origin match, Smith was able to be recalled to play five-eighth for the Maroons. After playing in the Canberra Raiders' inaugural season in 1982, Smith retired. He has since been a selector for the Queensland Origin team in the 1990s.

References

Allan Smith at stateoforigin.com.au
Queensland representatives at qrl.com.au

1955 births
Living people
Australian rugby league administrators
Australian rugby league players
Canberra Raiders players
Fortitude Valley Diehards players
Queensland Rugby League State of Origin players
North Sydney Bears players
Rugby league centres
Rugby league five-eighths
Rugby league players from Toowoomba